Annunciation Cathedral or Cathedral of the Annunciation may refer to:

United States
Cathedral of the Annunciation (Stockton, California)
Annunciation Cathedral, of the Greek Orthodox Metropolis of San Francisco, California
Annunciation Cathedral, of the Greek Orthodox Metropolis of Chicago, Illinois
Annunciation Greek Orthodox Cathedral of New England, Boston, Massachusetts
Annunciation Melkite Catholic Cathedral, Boston, Massachusetts
Annunciation Greek Orthodox Cathedral (Houston), Texas

Elsewhere
 Cathedral of the Annunciation, Gospić, Croatia
 Metropolitan Cathedral of Athens, Greece
 Cathedral of the Annunciation of the Blessed Virgin Mary and St Nathy, Ballaghaderreen, Ireland
 Cathedral of the Annunciation, Jerusalem, Israel
 Cathedral of Our Lady of the Annunciation (Catarman), Northern Samar, Philippines
 Cathedral of the Annunciation, Moscow, Russia
Annunciation Cathedral, Voronezh, Russia
Annunciation Cathedral, Kharkiv, Ukraine